Salomon Garf (6 December 1879, Amsterdam – 27 August 1943, Auschwitz) was a Dutch painter and graphic artist; known for his portraits and still lifes. He was murdered in the Holocaust.

Biography 
He was born to a family of diamond merchants and his father worked as a stockbroker. Rather than follow in the family business, he chose a career in art, studying at the "Institute for Applied Arts" (1892–1895), the "State Normal School for Applied Arts" (1895–1899) and the Rijksakademie (1899–1905), where he worked with August Allebé and Nicolaas van der Waay. In 1904, he entered the Prix de Rome with his depiction of the Raising of the son of the woman of Shunem, but the prize went to Jan Sluijters.

After graduating, he moved to the artists' colony in Laren and was married there two years later. In 1914, he won the Willink van Collenprijs for a painting of his studio. That same year, he and his family moved back to Amsterdam. In Laren, he had focused on painting rural interiors and still lifes. Once he had become established in Amsterdam, he mostly produced portraits and interior scenes with elegantly dressed women. His wife died in 1928, and he never remarried. He was a member of Arti et Amicitiae and, in 1933, was awarded their golden medal on behalf of Queen Wilhelmina. Garf's work was included in the 1939 exhibition and sale Onze Kunst van Heden (Our Art of Today) at the Rijksmuseum in Amsterdam.

In 1938, he became a member of Arti's Board of Directors, but was expelled from the organization in 1941, by orders of the German occupation command. He then became active in the Resistance, helping to forge false "Persoonsbewijzen" (Identity Cards). On August 6, 1943, he was arrested and sent to Auschwitz, by way of the Westerbork transit camp, and was murdered. His students managed to save the contents of his studio before they were confiscated.

Selected paintings

References

External links

ArtNet: More works by Garf.

1879 births
1943 deaths
20th-century Dutch painters
Dutch male painters
Dutch still life painters
Portrait painters
Jewish painters
Dutch people who died in Auschwitz concentration camp
Painters from Amsterdam
Resistance members from Amsterdam
Dutch Jews who died in the Holocaust
20th-century Dutch male artists